Nigel Pegram (born 22 November 1940) is a South African-English actor and voice artist. He is best known for playing Eric in Robert's Robots (1973–1974), Group-Captain Ruark in Get Some In! (1977–1978), Sir Reginald in All Dogs Go to Heaven (1989), Mrs Willa Westinghouse in The American Way (1986), General Woundwort in Watership Down (2001) and starred as Nigel in three series in the hit ITV comedy drama series Outside Edge (1994–1996). As a character actor, has played various roles on stage, TV and film.

Early life 
Pegram was born Cape Town, South Africa in 1940, moving to Bulawayo in Southern Rhodesia following his parents' divorce in 1942. His childhood took him to Batu Gajah in Malaya in 1947, Oxford in 1949, back to Bulawayo and then on to Tanganyika and Uganda in the 1950's, his peripatetic early life giving him the foundation for the many voices he uses in his professional work.  He studied at Falcon College, Southern Rhodesia, and later gained a BA degree in Law at the University of Natal in Durban. In 1962 he moved to the United Kingdom, where he studied at St Edmund Hall, Oxford. He soon joined the Oxford University Dramatic Society and in the summer of 1963 became involved the burgeoning British satire scene, performing at the Blue Angel Club, London, and in 1964 he participated in the Oxford Revue at the Edinburgh Festival alongside the likes of future Monty Python stars Michael Palin and Terry Jones.

Career 
After completing his studies, in 1965 Pegram moved to the United States when he joined the Oxford – Cambridge Revue for a three month engagement with the Second City Company  in Chicago. The following year he joined the cast of the musical revue Wait a Minim!, replacing Jeremy Taylor when the show moved to Broadway in early 1966, where he stayed on for a further two years at runs in various theatres across the US including the John Golden Theatre and Colonial Theatre. Shortly after marrying his fellow Wait a Minim star, ex Royal Ballet principal and actress April Olrich, in 1969 they returned to London and later that year he appeared on stage in the revue Postscripts, at the Hampstead Theatre Club, London.

From the early 1970s onwards, Pegram frequently featured in character roles within various films and TV programs including Robert's Robots (1973–1974), Larry Grayson (1975), Space: 1999 (1977), Get Some In! (1977–1978), The Professionals (1980), Fresh Fields (1985), The American Way (1986), Pulaski (1987), Drop the Dead Donkey (1990), Lovejoy (1992), Van der Valk (1992), Outside Edge (1994–1996), Proteus (1995), Melissa (1997), Written in Blood (1998) and Doctors (2003).

He has also done frequent work as a voice artist, voicing characters in animated films including All Dogs Go to Heaven (1989), An American Tail: Fivel Goes West (1991) and the TV series adaptions of Enid Blyton's Enchanted Lands (1998) and Watership Down (2001). In 1999, he was reunited with his former Oxford alumunus Michael Palin, when he voiced Ernest Hemmingway in Palin's documentary series Michael Palin's Hemmingway Adventure.

Pegram appeared in two series of the children's series Robert's Robots in the role of Eric, an android. In 1977 he played Cernik in an episode of the sci-fi series Space:1999; later that same year he appeared as Group Captain Ruark in an episode of the army camp sitcom Get Some In!, he returned as a regular character during the show's fourth and final series when it was relocated to an army hospital setting. In 1986, he appeared as transgender US presidential candidate Mrs Willa Westinghouse in the sci-fi comedy The American Way with Dennis Hopper and Michael J. Pollard, although the film was critically panned, Pegram's role was lauded by the critics. The following year Pegram appeared in four episodes as a TV Director in the drama series Pulaski, written by Roy Clarke.

Pegram is best remembered for playing the reacurring role of Nigel in three series of the ITV cricketing comedy drama series Outside Edge, based on the play by Richard Harris, in a part that was written specifically for him. The series was quite successful at the time, winning a number awards including Best TV Comedy Drama at the British Comedy Awards in 1994.

Outside his work in film and television, he has frequently appeared on stage. During the 1970s he was a member of the Reunion Theatre Company who staged shows at the Dolphin and Anchor Studio Theatre in Chichester. He appeared in roles such as a TV announcer in Beeston Craig  and an Interviewee in an adaption of Before Breakfast by Eugene O'Neill. During this time, he also appeared in various pantomimes including Babes in the Wood and Red Riding Hood. He also appeared as a vicar in Curate's Egg, the Duke of Windsor in the 1980 UK tour of Crown Matrimonial, Melvin P. Thorpe in the West End production of The Best Little Whorehouse in Texas, and Wilson in The Case of the Dead Flamingo. More recently he appeared as Adam in Peter Hall's production of As You Like It in 2003, and the American Secretary of State Byrnes in Eden's Empire by James Graham, which was staged at the Finborough Theatre, London in 2006.

In 2010, Pegram appeared in an episode of the long-running detective series Agatha Christie's Poirot, in which he played Reverend Babbington in the episode 'Three Act Tragedy'. In 2011 he appeared as Bernard in the sitcom Outnumbered, and latterly as Alistair in an episode of Vicious, broadcast in June 2015.

Personal life 
In 1968, Pegram married Zanzibar born ex Royal Ballet principal and actress April Olrich, one of his co stars in Wait a Minim!, on top of Coit Tower in San Francisco prior to their move to London the following year. They remained married for 46 years until her death in April 2014.Upon her death. he took over sponsoring her April Olrich Award for Dynamic Performance which she founded at the Royal Ballet School in Richmond Park.

Filmography

Selected Theatre roles

References

External links 
 Nigel Pegram at IMDb
 Nigel Peagram at IMDb
 Nigel Pegram at IBDM
 Nigel Pegram at British Comedy Guide
 Nigel Pegram at Theatricalia
 Nigel Pegram at Twitter
 Nigel Pegram at Avelyman

Alumni of Falcon College
British actors
South African male actors
People from Cape Town
1940 births
Living people